Argyresthia calliphanes is a moth of the family Yponomeutidae first described by Edward Meyrick in 1913. It is found in Canada from Ontario to British Columbia and possibly in Alberta, Saskatchewan and Manitoba. In the United States, it ranges from New York to California.

The wingspan is 13–14 mm. The forewings are shining snow white with shining golden markings, partially edged with coppery. The hindwings are grey, but darker posteriorly. Adults are on wing from June to August.

The larvae feed on Alnus species.

References

Moths described in 1913
Argyresthia
Moths of North America